Bjarni Felixson (born 27 December 1936), commonly known as Bjarni Fel, is an Icelandic former footballer, sports reporter and commentator. Nicknamed The Red Lion due to his red hair, he won six caps for the Iceland national football team between 1962 and 1964. He played for Knattspyrnufélag Reykjavíkur for several seasons, winning the national championship five times and the Icelandic Cup seven times.

Playing career
From 1956 to 1968, Bjarni played for Knattspyrnufélag Reykjavíkur. Playing as a defender, he was not known as a great offensive threat and only scored two goals during his career. In a 1997 interview with Morgunblaðið, he stated that after scoring what ended being his last goal, the opposing goalkeeper muttered "I knew I should've retired last season".

Broadcasting career
Bjarni worked as sports reporter and commentator for RÚV for 42 years and was the prime factor in bringing the English football to the Icelandic audience. He was at Hillsborough Stadium as a commentator during the Hillsborough disaster.

Personal life
Bjarni's brothers, Hörður and Gunnar, both played with him on KR and the Icelandic national team. In 1963, all three brothers played together for Iceland in two games against England.

In 2008, a sports bar in Reykjavík was named Bjarni Fel Sportsbar in his honour.

Titles
Icelandic Championships: (5)
1959, 1961, 1963, 1965, 1968
Icelandic Cup: (7)
1960, 1961, 1962, 1963, 1964, 1966, 1967

References

External links

1936 births
Living people
Association football defenders
Bjarni Felixson
Bjarni Felixson
Bjarni Felixson
Bjarni Felixson